The 2013 Brown Bears football team represented Brown University in the 2013 NCAA Division I FCS football season. They were led by 16th year head coach Phil Estes and played their home games at Brown Stadium. They were a member of the Ivy League. They finished with a record of 6–4 overall, 3–4 in Ivy League play for a 3 way tie finish for 4th. Brown averaged 5,098 fans per game.

Schedule

References

Brown
Brown Bears football seasons
Brown Bears football